Gabriela Zamišková (née Brosková; born 18 December 1973, in Liptovský Mikuláš) is a Slovak slalom canoeist who competed at the international level from 1993 to 2005.

She won 3 medals at the European Championships (2 golds and 1 silver). She also finished fifth in the K1 event at the 1996 Summer Olympics in Atlanta.

World Cup individual podiums

References

1973 births
Canoeists at the 1996 Summer Olympics
Living people
Olympic canoeists of Slovakia
Slovak female canoeists
Sportspeople from Liptovský Mikuláš